James Frederick Lister (June 21, 1843 – February 9, 1902) was a Canadian lawyer, judge, and politician.

Born in Belleville, Canada West, Lister was educated at the Sarnia Grammar School. A lawyer, he practised law in Sarnia, Ontario and was a county solicitor from 1885 to 1898. He was created a Queen's Counsel by the Government of Ontario in 1890. He was first elected to the House of Commons of Canada for the electoral district of Lambton West in the 1882 federal election. A Liberal, he was re-elected in 1887, 1891, and 1896. In 1898, he was appointed a Judge of the Court of Appeal.

He died in Toronto and was buried in Lakeview Cemetery in Sarnia.

References
 
 Short sketches with photographs of the wardens, parliamentary representatives, judicial officers and county officials of the county of Lambton... : from 1852 to 1917

1843 births
1902 deaths
Liberal Party of Canada MPs
Members of the House of Commons of Canada from Ontario
Canadian King's Counsel